GRITradio was a weekend radio show hosted by writer and long-time radio host Laura Flanders and produced by GRITtv.  The show features in-depth interviews with activists, journalists, and writers. 

The show began as The Laura Flanders Show and became RadioNation with Laura Flanders on January 7, 2006.  The show airs weekend evenings on noncommercial radio stations across the country.

Prior to 2006, RadioNation was a double-half-hour, weekly program hosted by Marc Cooper, produced in collaboration with Pacifica Radio.

Guest hosts 
 Ned Sublette
 Jessica Ward

Staff 
 Host: Laura Flanders
 Senior Producer: Steve Rosenfeld
 Producer: Christabel Nsiah-Buadi

External links 
 Official show site
 Show page on Flanders's website

Air America (radio network)
American talk radio programs